Navillera is a 2021 South Korean television series starring Park In-hwan, Song Kang, Na Moon-hee, and Hong Seung-hee. Based on the Daum webtoon of the same name written by Hun and illustrated by Ji-min between 2016 and 2017, it aired on tvN from March 22 to April 27, 2021. It is also available for streaming on Netflix. The series follows the challenges faced by a 70 year old retired mailman attempting to learn ballet and dance Swan Lake despite his deteriorating Alzheimer's condition.

Synopsis
Navillera tells the story of Shim Deok-chul (Park In-hwan), a 70-year-old retired mailman who decides to pursue his life-long dream of learning ballet, which does not please his family. At the dance academy, he meets Lee Chae-rok (Song Kang), a 23-year-old dancer who became interested in ballet after trying out different sports — his mother was a ballet dancer before she died of disease when he was young. He is struggling financially and thinks of giving up ballet until meeting Deok-chul, which changes his mind.

Sim Deok-chul's commitment to his dream inspires people with different genders, ages, and social status trying to achieve their dreams and do what makes them happy. The South China Morning Post states in their review of the series that "Navillera deals with relatable issues of old age, whether you're the one approaching it or your loved ones are, but while the fear that a diagnosis like Alzheimer’s can cause is clearly evoked by the series, it steers clear of the day-to-day realities of the condition".

Characters

Main
 Park In-hwan as Shim Deok-chul
 A retiree who has just celebrated his 70th birthday. Seeing how his friends started to regret dreams they could not pursue in their younger age, he decided to try to fulfill his long-life dream of becoming a ballerino. He then meets Lee Chae-rok after accidentally seeing him practicing for his upcoming ballet competition.
 Song Kang as Lee Chae-rok
 A 23-year-old ballerino who is struggling financially and tries to support himself by working as a part-timer at a café. His deceased mother was a ballerina, whilst his father Lee Moo-young was in jail. His passion for ballet has started to fade away as he is having a hard time in living. Everything started to change slowly after he meets Shim Deok-chul.
 Na Moon-hee as Choi Hae-nam
 Deok-chul's wife who cares a lot for her family. At first, she doesn't approve of her husband's ballet dreams. However, after seeing how passionate he is, she supports him.
 Hong Seung-hee as Shim Eun-ho
 Deok-chul's granddaughter who is currently working as an intern at the same café as Chae-rok. She eventually becomes friends with him.

Supporting
 Jo Sung-ha as Lee Moo-young
 Chae-rok's father who used to be a soccer coach at his school before going to jail. He was released recently and lives apart from his son to make a living.
 Kim Tae-hoon as Ki Seung-joo
 Chae-rok's ballet teacher, owner of Ballet Studio. He appears to be strict and short-tempered, but he actually cares a lot about his students.
 Shin Eun-jung as Kim Ae-ran
 Eun-ho's mother, daughter-in-law of Deok-chul.
 Jung Hae-kyun as Shim Sung-san
 Eun-ho's father, Deok-chul's first son. He aggressively opposes his father taking ballet lessons.
 Kim Soo-jin as Shim Sung-suk
 Deok-chul's daughter, wife of struggling politician Young-il.
 Yoon Ji-hye as Eun So-ri
 Seung-joo's ex-wife who is a ballet teacher at a Hankuk University of Arts Dance School.
 Lee So-yeong as Yoo An-na
 Pianist at Ballet Studio.
 Jung Hee-tae as Young-il
 Sung-suk's husband who is a politician.
 Jo Bok-rae as Shim Sung-gwan
 Deok-chul's second son who quit being a doctor and is struggling in pursuing his dream of becoming a film director. 
 Kim Hyun-mok as Kim Se-jong
 Chae-rok's friend since their school days, also his fellow part-timer at a café. 
 Kim Kwon as Yang Ho-beom
 Chae-rok's former friend who now resents him after the latter's father beat him up, claiming that he "doesn't deserve to live a good life".

Original soundtrack

Part 1

Viewership

References

External links
  
 
 
 
 Navillera: Like a Butterfly at Tapas.io

Webtoons
Tapastic webcomics
TVN (South Korean TV channel) television dramas
2021 South Korean television series debuts
Television series about ballet
Television shows based on South Korean webtoons
Television series by Studio Dragon
South Korean pre-produced television series
Korean-language Netflix exclusive international distribution programming